USA-268, also known as NROL-37, is an American signals intelligence satellite. Though officially classified, it is known to be an Advanced Orion satellite, making it one of the largest and most expensive satellites ever built.

Launch 

USA-268 was launched at 17:51 UTC on 11 June 2016 from Space Launch Complex 37B. It was the ninth flight of a Delta IV Heavy, and the fifth carrying an Advanced Orion.

See also 

 List of NRO Launches
 2016 in spaceflight

References 

Reconnaissance satellites of the United States
Signals intelligence satellites
2016 establishments in the United States